Synthetic Sin is a 1929 American comedy film directed by William A. Seiter, based on a play of the same name. While filmed as a silent, it was released by Warner Bros. accompanied with a Vitaphone music soundtrack and sound effects. However most of the Vitaphone discs are still lost, apart from the final reel.

Plot
Famed playwright Donald Anthony returns home to Magnolia Gap, Virginia, and proposes to Betty Fairfax. She accepts and he offers her the lead part in his next play, but the play is a disaster. Donald tells her that she is unsuited for the role, that it requires someone with more life experience. Rather than return home defeated, Betty stays in New York, in a bad neighborhood where local gangsters adopt her as their own. When Donald comes to visit her, they eject him. There is a gunfight, and in the resulting confusion Donald sweeps in and rescues Betty. After the excitement, Betty gives up her dreams of the stage and devotes herself to Donald.

Cast
Colleen Moore as Betty Fairfax
Antonio Moreno as Donald Anthony
Edythe Chapman as Mrs. Fairfax
Kathryn McGuire as Margery Fairfax
Gertrude Howard as Cassie
Gertrude Astor as Sheila Kelly
Ray Turner as Sam (credited as Raymond Turner)
Montagu Love as Brandy Mulane
Ben Hendricks Jr. as Frank
Philip Sleeman as Tony (credited as Phil Sleeman)
Jack Byron as Tony's Henchman
Fred Warren as Joe
Jay Eaton as Member of Frank's Gang
Stanley Blystone as Member of Frank's Gang
Art Rowlands as Member of Frank's Gang
Dick Gordon as Member of Frank's Gang
Julanne Johnston as Member of Frank's Gang
Hazel Howell as Member of Frank's Gang

Preservation status
A copy survives at the Cineteca Italiana archive in Milan. Previously it was considered to be a lost film. Colleen Moore had deposited copies of several of her movies with the Museum of Modern Art (MOMA), but it allowed the films to decompose before they could be restored.

See also
List of early Warner Bros. sound and talking features
Gertrude Astor filmography

References
Notes

Bibliography
Codori, Jeff (2012), Colleen Moore; A Biography of the Silent Film Star, McFarland Publishing,(Print , EBook ).

External links
 
 
 Stills at silentlondon.co.uk

1929 films
1929 comedy films
1920s rediscovered films
American black-and-white films
Silent American comedy films
American silent feature films
Films directed by William A. Seiter
Films set in Virginia
First National Pictures films
Rediscovered American films
Transitional sound comedy films
1920s American films
1920s English-language films